The Louisville Falls Fountain was intended as a major tourist attraction in Louisville, Kentucky. It was dedicated August 19, 1988, four days after the death of its benefactor, Barry Bingham Sr. who, along with his wife, Mary Caperton Bingham, had donated $2.6 million towards the project and future upkeep.  The computer-controlled fountain, located near the Belle of Louisville and just west of the George Rogers Clark Memorial Bridge, was supposed to be the tallest floating fountain in the world, and spewed 15,800 gallons of water per minute in the shape of a Fleur-de-lis. The Binghams were inspired by a fountain in Lake Geneva, Switzerland, and hoped a fountain in Louisville would become a symbol for the city on par with the Gateway Arch in St. Louis.

It was to be used from Memorial Day through Thanksgiving every day from morning through midnight, and stored during the winter in Utica, Indiana. It was lit by colored lights, and visible from the Belvedere, as well as many locations in Downtown Louisville and Jeffersonville, Indiana.

Costs were higher than expected, and the fountain malfunctioned several times, quickly depleting the maintenance fund. Maintenance was eventually taken over by the Louisville Water Company. It initially shot water to a height of 420 feet, though to lower operation costs this was eventually lowered by the water company to 375 feet.

The fountain was shut down permanently after malfunctions in 1998. It was eventually sold for scrap, and now sits in the Ohio River at the McBride Towboat Company in New Albany, IN waiting to be taken apart. It is visible on Google Earth at Latitude 38°13'54.77" Longitude -85°50'39.09". According to reports, some parts have been scrapped.

See also
History of Louisville, Kentucky

References

External links
"Falls Fountain Flashback" — Article from August 19, 2008 issue of the Louisville Eccentric Observer
"Fountain on Film", August 13, 2008

Buildings and structures completed in 1988
Demolished buildings and structures in Louisville, Kentucky
Fountains in Kentucky
Landmarks in Kentucky
Ohio River